Aldamira Guedes Fernandes (1923 – 2013) was a Brazilian politician. 

She was the first woman to be Mayor in Brazil.

References

1923 births
2013 deaths
20th-century Brazilian women politicians